Diguva-magham is a village in Chittoor district of the Indian state of Andhra Pradesh. It is located in Thavanampalle mandal. Many prominent industrialists, politicians and entrepreneurs such as Aruna Kumari Galla, Galla Jayadev, W Raja Naidu hail from Diguva-magham.

Notable residents
 Galla Aruna Kumari
 Galla Jayadev

References

Villages in Chittoor district